The Lavanttal Alps are part of the Central Eastern Alps in Austria and Slovenia, between the river Mur in the north and the Drava in the south.

The mountains are named after the central valley of Lavanttal and the Lavant River which runs in their midst. Historically they were also viewed, along with the neighbouring Gurktal Alps range, as part of the larger "Noric Alps", but that grouping had no geological basis.

Subdivision
The main ranges of the Lavanttal Alps are:
Seetal Alps, stretching along the Mur River from Scheifling to Zeltweg in Styria, including the highest peak, Mt. Zirbitzkogel, 
Saualpe, the lower westernmost range in Carinthia, between Klippitztörl Pass in the north and the Drava in the south
Packalpe and Stubalpe, stretching from Obdach Saddle in the west and Gaberl Pass in the north to the Packsattel in the south, including Mt. Ameringkogel, 
Koralpe, the southern continuation along the Styrian-Carinthian border
The Kozjak Mountains (also Possruck Mountains), along the border of Austria with Slovenia, from Radl Pass in the west down to the Slovene Hills and the Drava River.
Gleinalpe, stretching from the Mur near Zeltweg in the northeast and Gaberl Pass in the southwest down to the Graz Basin, crossed by the Gleinalm Tunnel.

References

External links 

 
Mountain ranges of Carinthia (state)
Mountain ranges of Styria
Mountain ranges of Slovenia